Oakland, Ontario may refer to:

Oakland, Brant County, Ontario
Oakland, Essex County, Ontario